Frank Wright Tuttle (August 6, 1892 – January 6, 1963) was a Hollywood film director and writer who directed films from 1922 (The Cradle Buster) to 1959 (Island of Lost Women).

Biography

Frank Tuttle was educated at Yale University, where he edited campus humor magazine The Yale Record.

After graduation, he worked in New York City in the advertising department of the Metropolitan Music Bureau. He later moved to Hollywood, where he became a film director for Paramount. His films are largely in the comedy and film noir genres.

In 1947, his career ground to a temporary halt with the onset of the first of the House Un-American Activities Committee hearings on Communist infiltration of the movie industry. Tuttle had joined the American Communist Party in 1937 in reaction to Hitler's rise to power. Unable to find work in the United States, he moved to France, where he made Gunman in the Streets (1950) starring Simone Signoret and Dane Clark. In 1951, after a decade as a member of the Communist Party, Tuttle gave 36 names to the HUAC.

Death
Tuttle died in Hollywood, California, on January 6, 1963, aged 70. He was survived by his three daughters.

Selected filmography
 The Cradle Buster (1922)
 Puritan Passions (1923) starring Mary Astor
 Second Fiddle (1923) starring Mary Astor
Youthful Cheaters (1923)
 Grit (1924)
 Dangerous Money (1924)
 The Manicure Girl (1925)
 The Lucky Devil (1925)
 Lovers in Quarantine (1925) starring Bebe Daniels and the other Harrison Ford
 Kid Boots (1926) starring Eddie Cantor and Clara Bow
 Love 'Em and Leave 'Em (1926) starring Evelyn Brent and Louise Brooks
 The American Venus (1926) with Douglas Fairbanks, Jr.
 The Untamed Lady (1926) starring Gloria Swanson
 Blind Alleys (1927) starring Evelyn Brent and Thomas Meighan
 Time to Love (1927)
 One Woman to Another (1927)
 Something Always Happens (1928)
 Varsity (1928) starring Charles "Buddy" Rogers and Mary Brian
 The Canary Murder Case (additional sound footage; 1929) starring William Powell as Philo Vance
 The Green Murder Case starring William Powell as Philo Vance
 Sweetie (1929) starring Nancy Carroll
 Paramount on Parade (1930), Paramount's all-star revue with a screenplay by Joseph L. Mankiewicz
 The Benson Murder Case (1930) starring William Powell as Philo Vance
 True to the Navy (1930) starring Clara Bow and Fredric March
 It Pays to Advertise (1931) starring Carole Lombard
 No Limit (1931) starring Clara Bow and Thelma Todd
 This Reckless Age starring Charles "Buddy" Rogers
 The Big Broadcast (1932) starring Bing Crosby
 This Is the Night (1932) with Cary Grant
 Roman Scandals (1933) starring Eddie Cantor
 Springtime for Henry (1934) starring Otto Kruger and Nigel Bruce
 Here is My Heart (1934) starring Bing Crosby
 Ladies Should Listen (1934) starring Cary Grant
 Two for Tonight (1935) starring Bing Crosby
 The Glass Key (1935), film adaptation of Dashiell Hammett's novel of the same name
 All the King's Horses (1935) starring Carl Brisson
 College Holiday (1936) starring Jack Benny, George Burns and Gracie Allen
 Waikiki Wedding (1937) starring Bing Crosby
 Doctor Rhythm (1938) starring Bing Crosby
 Paris Honeymoon (1939) starring Bing Crosby
 I Stole a Million (1939) starring George Raft and written by Nathanael West
 Charlie McCarthy, Detective (1939) starring Edgar Bergen
 Lucky Jordan (1942) starring Sheldon Leonard and Alan Ladd
 This Gun for Hire (1942) starring Veronica Lake and Alan Ladd
 Star Spangled Rhythm (contributing director; 1943) with sketches by George S. Kaufman
 The Hour Before the Dawn (1944) starring Veronica Lake and based on the novel by W. Somerset Maugham
 Don Juan Quilligan (1945) starring Phil Silvers
 The Great John L. (1945) starring Linda Darnell
 Suspense (1946) starring Barry Sullivan and Belita
 Swell Guy (1946) starring Sonny Tufts
 Gunman in the Streets (1950) starring Simone Signoret
 The Magic Face (1951) starring Luther Adler
 Hell on Frisco Bay (1956) starring Alan Ladd and Edward G. Robinson
 A Cry in the Night (1956) starring Edmond O'Brien, Natalie Wood and Raymond Burr
 Island of Lost Women (1959) starring Jeff Richards and produced by Alan Ladd

References

External links

 

1892 births
1963 deaths
Film directors from New York City
People from Greater Los Angeles
Yale University alumni
Film directors from California
Burials at Westwood Village Memorial Park Cemetery